Zekić is a Croatian and sometimes Bosniak and Serbian family name.

The Zekić name is predominantly a Croatian name from the vicinity of Trogir. Most Zekić in the past one hundred years have been born in the Dračevac Ninski region, where one in six Zekić surnames is found. Today in Croatia there are about 1,000 Zekić from about 300 in the 1950s.

Individuals
 Zoran Zekić (b. 1974), Croatian football player and manager
 Miljan Zekić (b. 1988), Serbian tennis player

References

Croatian surnames
Serbian surnames